Wombwell railway station is a railway station serving the town of Wombwell in South Yorkshire, England. The station was opened by the Midland Railway on 1 July 1897, and between 25 September 1950 and 20 February 1969 was known as Wombwell West to distinguish it from Wombwell's other railway station, Wombwell Central, which closed in 1959.

CCTV was recently installed for the purposes of crime prevention. Other recent improvements to the station include new signage, lighting, and, for the first time, installation of passenger information display screens to provide real-time service information.

The station car park was extended in 2009 to give a total of 74 spaces for rail users.

Facilities 
There are no permanent buildings remaining at the station (which is unmanned), aside from standard waiting shelters on each platform.  Tickets can only be bought in advance or on the train, as the self-service ticket machine has been removed.  The aforementioned CIS displays provide train running information, along with timetable poster boards.  There is step-free access to both platforms via ramps from the road above.

Services
A single southbound through train to  calls here on Saturday mornings only at 06.22.

Notes

Railway stations in Barnsley
DfT Category F1 stations
Former Midland Railway stations
Railway stations in Great Britain opened in 1897
Northern franchise railway stations